Tim Latteier (born 20 May 2000) is a German footballer who plays as a midfielder for  club Bayreuth.

Career
Latteier made his professional debut for 1. FC Nürnberg in the 2. Bundesliga on 24 January 2021, coming on as a substitute in the 69th minute for Enrico Valentini against Hannover 96. The home match finished as a 5–2 loss for Nürnberg.

For the 2022–23 season, Latteier moved to Bayreuth.

References

External links
 
 
 
 

2000 births
Living people
People from Kitzingen
Sportspeople from Lower Franconia
Footballers from Bavaria
German footballers
Association football midfielders
1. FC Nürnberg II players
1. FC Nürnberg players
SpVgg Bayreuth players
2. Bundesliga players
Regionalliga players
3. Liga players